Nicolae Titulescu (4 March 1882 – 17 March 1941) was a Romanian diplomat, at various times government minister, finance and foreign minister, and for two terms president of the General Assembly of the League of Nations (1930–32).

Early years
Titulescu  was born in Craiova, the son of a solicitor. He grew up at his father's estate in Titulești, a commune in Romania that was later named after him. Upon graduating with honours in 1900 from the Carol I High School in Craiova, Titulescu studied law in Paris, obtaining his doctorate with the thesis Essai sur une théorie des droits éventuels.  In 1905, Titulescu returned to Romania as a professor of law at the University of Iași, and in 1907 he moved to Bucharest.

Political career

Following the Romanian elections of 1912, Titulescu became a parliamentarian with the Conservative-Democratic Party led by Take Ionescu, and five years later he became a member of the government of Ion I. C. Brătianu as Minister of Finance.

In the summer of 1918, together with other prominent Romanians (Take Ionescu, Octavian Goga, Traian Vuia, Constantin Mille), Titulescu formed, in Paris, the National Romanian Committee, with the purpose of promoting in international public opinion the right of the Romanian people to national unity, the committee being officially recognised as the plenipotentiary de facto organ of the Romanian nation.

From 1927 to 1928, Titulescu was the minister of foreign affairs.

Beginning in 1921, Titulescu functioned as the permanent representative of Romania to the League of Nations in Geneva. He was chosen twice (in 1930 and 1931) to be the president of that organization. In this capacity, he fought for the preservation of stable borders through the maintenance of peace, for good relations between both large and small neighboring states, for the respect of the sovereignty and equality of all nations in the international community, for collective security, and the prevention of aggression. In 1935, Titulescu was elected a titular member of the Romanian Academy.

In June 1936, Titulescu reacted to the buffoonery exhibited by the Italian journalists when Emperor Haile Selassie I spoke to the League after Ethiopia had been invaded and occupied by Fascist Italy. He jumped to his feet and shouted:  "To the door with the savages!" ("A la porte les sauvages!"). Patrick Leigh Fermor described him as "tall and mandarin-like, but with splendid histrionic gestures, and obviously a comic genius of the first order".

Exile and death
Later in 1936, King Carol II removed Titulescu from all official positions, asking him to leave the country. Settling first in Switzerland, he later moved to France. In exile, he continued in conferences and newspaper articles to propagate the idea of the preservation of peace, as he perceived the danger of the approaching war. He returned to Romania in November 1937, partly by the efforts of Iuliu Maniu.

In 1937, Titulescu again left Romania and took refuge in France. At Cannes, he denounced the Romanian fascist regime. In 1941, Titulescu died in Cannes following a long illness. In his will, he asked to be buried in Romania.

In 1989, after the fall of communist Romania during the Romanian Revolution, the honouring of Titulescu's request became possible. On 14 March 1992, his remains were reburied in the Sfânta Ecaterina cemetery in  Șcheii Brașovului, next to St. Nicholas Church, Brașov after a difficult legal procedure organized by Jean-Paul Carteron, a French attorney. He was awarded Order of the White Eagle and other decorations.

References

External links

 

1882 births
1941 deaths
Anti-fascists
People from Craiova
Eastern Orthodox Christians from Romania
Conservative-Democratic Party politicians
Romanian Ministers of Finance
Romanian Ministers of Foreign Affairs
Members of the Chamber of Deputies (Romania)
Romanian diplomats
Romanian Freemasons
Carol I National College alumni
University of Paris alumni
Titular members of the Romanian Academy